Vels Institute of Science, Technology & Advanced Studies (VISTAS) is an institute of higher education located in Pallavaram, Chennai, Tamil Nadu, India.
It was established in 1992 and granted Deemed University status in 2008 by University Grants Commission under section 3 of UGC Act 1956.

Schools
VISTAS has established following schools:

 School of Engineering
 School of Pharmacy
 School of Hotel & Catering Management
 School of Management & Commerce
 School of Maritime Studies
 School of Ocean Engineering
 School of Computing Sciences
 School of Law
 School of Physiotherapy
 School of Life Sciences
 School of Basic Sciences
 School of Mass Communication
 School of Languages
 School of Education
 School of Music & Fine Arts
 Department of Aviation
 Vels Medical College and Hospital

Campus & Infrastructure

Campus 
Campus is located in the heart of the city in Pallavaram with about 29.13 acres. It is the only university campus which has its main campus within the city.

Hostel
There are separate hostels for men and women on the campus. A laundry facility is available to the students for a charge. A qualified medical attendant is available at the campus. Medical and hospital facilities are available at Pallavaram and the cost is met by the students. Mess and canteen facility is available.,

Research Centres 
The following research centres are established at VISTAS to conduct research.

 Centre of Advanced R&D
 Centre for Fish Immunology
 VISTAS Technology Business Incubation Centre
 Central Instrumentation Laboratory
 Centre Energy Alternative Fuels
 Centre IOT Road Safety Health Care
 Artificial Intelligence Research Lab
 Centre Automation Power Conservation
 Centre for Materials Research
 VISTAS SPS Lab
 Elephant Research Centre

Ranking

Vels Institute of Science, Technology & Advanced Studies  was ranked 43 in India by the National Institutional Ranking Framework (NIRF) pharmacy ranking in 2020.

Alumni 

 Anjali Rao, actress
 Abinash Ganapathi, model - Mr. Chennai 2018

References

Chennai
Educational institutions established in 1992
Maritime colleges in India
Dental colleges in India
Dentistry education
Business schools in Tamil Nadu
Universities in Chennai
Academic institutions formerly affiliated with the University of Madras
1992 establishments in Tamil Nadu